Health care in Poland is insurance based, delivered through a publicly funded health care system called the Narodowy Fundusz Zdrowia, which is free for all the citizens of Poland provided they fall into the "insured" category (usually meaning that they have health insurance paid for by their employer, or are the spouse or child of an insured person).  According to Article 68 of the Polish Constitution everyone has a right to have access to health care. Citizens are granted equal access to the publicly funded healthcare system. In particular, the government is obliged to provide free health care to young children, pregnant women, disabled people, and the elderly. However, private healthcare use is very extensive in Poland. Patients who are uninsured have to pay the full cost of medical services. According to a study conducted by CBOS in 2016, out of 84% patients taking part in the survey, 40% declared use of both private and public health services, 37% use only public health care, and 7% use only private health services. 77% of all responders declared using private health care is caused by long waiting for public health care services.

Financing and health expenses
The main financing source is health insurance in the National Health Fund. Citizens are obligated to pay insurance fees (redistributed tax) which is 9% deducted from personal income (7,75% is deducted from the tax, 1,25% covered by insured goes directly to the National Health Fund).  
The national budget covers around 5% of all health care expenses. Since 2007 emergency rescue services are financed in total from the national budget.
About 70% of health expenses in Poland are covered by the National Health Fund, with the remaining 30% coming from private health insurance.

Structure
The management of the public health system is divided between the Minister of Health and three levels of territorial self-government. It has been suggested that this delays response to problems.

The structure of the health system in Poland is regulated by these laws:   

The Narodowy Fundusz Zdrowia is the National Health Fund of Poland.

Health service providers

 Health care units functioning as economic operators
 Self-sufficient public health care units:  research institutes, foundations, associations, and churches. 
 Private health care: medical, nursing, birth attendant, dentistry
 Drug stores

Primary care
The basis of the health care system is the  primary care physician, who is most commonly a specialist in family health. They are responsible for conducting treatment and taking preventive actions for assigned patients. If sickness requires the intervention of a specialist, the first contact doctor issues referral to a hospital or other health care unit. Primary care surgeries are open from Monday to Friday from 8:00 a.m. to 6:00 p.m. At other times the Narodowy Fundusz Zdrowia has contracts with 24-hour medical service units. Addresses and telephone numbers of units providing 24 hour-medical service are available in primary healthcare surgeries.  A referral is not needed for oncology, gynecology, psychiatry, dentistry, or sexually transmitted diseases. Not all dental treatment is covered by the health insurance scheme.

Control and supervising institutions
 National Sanitary Inspection (pol. sanepid)
 National Pharmacological Inspection
 Patients Ombudsman 
 Voivodeship centers of public health 
 Ministry of Health responsible for creating and executing national health programs, control and supervision on general health situation

Access to health services

According to The Act 240 dated 27.08.2004 about Health Care Public Funding, access to health care services can be provided if patient is able to confirm having health insurance by presenting a document such as an  Insurance card, an Insurance card for employee family members or a Pensionary card 

Referral is required to get access to:  
 hospital treatment 
 recovery treatment
 rehabilitation
 chronic disease care
Referral is not required for patients:
 suffering from tuberculosis
 infected with HIV
 combatants, war invalids, and repression victims 
 blind civilians if they are victims of war  
 privileged soldiers, veterans in case of treatment of injuries and infections during fulfilling duties outside country borders 
 drugs and alcohol addicted
 taking medical examination for organ donation

Emergency medical services

Emergency Medical Services (RM) in Poland are a service of public, pre-hospital emergency healthcare, including ambulance service, provided by the individual Polish cities and counties. Services are typically provided by the local, publicly operated hospital, and are generally funded by the government of Poland. In a number of cases, hospitals contract the services to private operators. In addition to publicly funded services, there are a variety of private-for-profit ambulance services operating independently.

Problems
The health care system in Poland has had problems for many years. According to the Euro health consumer index 2018, Poland was on 32nd place out of 35.
The main problems listed in Health Consumer Index 2016 are: 
 difficult access to specialist physician (especially to hospital treatment) and a long time of waiting for health services: planned serious surgery more than 90 days, cancer treatment more than 21 days, tomography more than 7 days
 bad results in cancer treatment: no access to modern medicines and high level of mortality 
 digital structure of health information: difficulties with electronic prescriptions and referrals, no access to examination results or list of authorized physicians

See also
 Health in Poland

References